Davari may refer to:
 Davari-ye Bala
 Davari-ye Pain

People
 Reza Davari Ardakani, Iranian philosopher 
 Daniel Davari, German-Iranian footballer
 Javad Davari, Iranian professional basketball player
 Mohammad Davari, Iranian journalist

Other
 Davari Shahnameh, a 19th-century manuscript of Ferdowsi's Shahnameh